Pleasant Hill may refer to any of the following places:

Canada
Pleasant Hill, Saskatoon, a neighbourhood

United States
Pleasant Hill, Alabama
Pleasant Hill, Arkansas (disambiguation)
Pleasant Hill, California
Pleasant Hill/Contra Costa Centre station
Pleasant Hill Historic District (Macon, Georgia), listed on the NRHP in Georgia
Pleasant Hill, Illinois
Pleasant Hill, Iowa
Pleasant Hill, Kentucky
 Pleasant Hill, Bienville Parish, Louisiana, an unincorporated community
 Pleasant Hill, Lincoln Parish, Louisiana, an unincorporated community
 Pleasant Hill, Natchitoches Parish, Louisiana, an unincorporated community
 Pleasant Hill, Sabine Parish, Louisiana, a village
 Pleasant Hill (Pomfret, Maryland)
Pleasant Hill, Missouri
Pleasant Hill Downtown Historic District, Pleasant Hill, MO,
 Pleasant Hill (Natchez, Mississippi), listed on the NRHP in Mississippi
 Pleasant Hill (Woodville, Mississippi), listed on the NRHP in Mississippi
Pleasant Hill, Nebraska
Pleasant Hill, North Carolina (disambiguation)
Pleasant Hill, Pennsylvania
Pleasant Hill, Tennessee
Pleasant Hill, Ohio
 Pleasant Hill (Milford, Ohio), listed on the NRHP in Ohio
Pleasant Hill, Oregon
Pleasant Hill Plantation
Pleasant Hill, Houston County, Texas, a ghost town
Pleasant Hill, Washington
Pleasant Hill, Washington, D.C.
Pleasant Hill Residential Historic District, Marshfield, WI
Pleasant Hill Historic District (disambiguation)
Pleasant Hills (disambiguation)